Persian-Sassanide art patterns have similarities with the art of the Bulgars, Khazars, and Saka-Scythians, and have recurred in Asia. They predominantly feature motifs of fighting animals. Gold was frequently used as a base for their art creations.

Patterns 
The characteristic patterns of Persian-Sassanide art exhibit similarities to the art of the Bulgars, Khazars, and Saka-Scythian, and have recurred at different locations in the Central Asia region. A "griffin fighting an elk" motif from the Treasure of Nagyszentmiklós, found in 1799 in what is today Romania, bears similarities with another griffin & elk motif discovered in the tombs of Hsiung-nu (early Huns, also Xiongnu) during Colonel Pyotr Kuzmich Kozlov expedition (1907–09) near Urga (Outer Mongolia).

A gold symbolization of "animals-in-fight" has been also found in the vicinity of the city of Turpan, the principal crossroad of the northern Silk Road. Golden "animals-in-fight" have also been identified as 3rd – 2nd century B.C. Mongolia (or southern Siberia), being characteristic of Hsiung-nu or Xiongnu.

The art of the nomads

The early history of the Nomads is not well recorded, which changed after their contact with cultures possessing written history. Nomadic people of the vast steppes of Asia were a major force in history. Their power was not in the empires they built, but rather the turmoil they created among ancient civilizations such as China or Persia, impacting their historical development substantially. It is believed that the nomads ranged widely, forever moving on for sake of richer grazing for their horses and sheep. Migrations were often seasonal. Their skill at extracting gold was unprecedented. In summer, during the tribe's seasonal migration, a fleece would be weighted on a riverbed to collect particles of alluvial gold. Upon the tribes' return, the fleece would be sheared, burned, and a gold ingot the size of a horse's hoof would result. The tay tayak (the horse's hoof) was a unit of gold for a long period, which was used as a measure of an amount of golden metal rather than money, since gold was not fabricated as currency. Using gold was a spiritual practice, as emblems of priestly office, prizes for physical prowess in ritual sport, or as adornment of the sacral ceremony of marriage.

See also 
 Iranian art
 History of decorative arts
 Toreutics
 Asian art
 Treasure of Nagyszentmiklós
 Hunnic Empire
 Xiongnu
 Scythian art
 Thraco-Cimmerian
 Turko-Persian tradition

References 

Art history
Late Roman Empire art
Sasanian art
Iconography